The Ice Age is a 1977 novel by British novelist Margaret Drabble. The novel follows the experiences of former BBC producer Anthony Keating as he experiences the ups and downs of life during the 1960s and 1970s. Depicting the property crisis in Britain during that period, novel diverges from her earlier psychological studies of individuals, focusing more on the "state of England".

Development
Drabble's inspiration was from reading newspapers, and reflecting on the extensive "economic analysis in the paper [about] declining Britain", something she didn't see reflected in fiction.

Reception
Kirkus Reviews was generally critical of the novel, writing that "Drabble's rich textures and great sympathy muffle the political echoes [...] her characters are too much alike ever really to clash".

References

1977 British novels
Novels by Margaret Drabble
Weidenfeld & Nicolson books